Joan Alexander Henríquez Contreras (born 24 April 1986) is a Chilean footballer who plays as a midfielder. His last club was Iberia.

External links
 Joan Henríquez at Football Lineups
 

1986 births
Living people
Chilean footballers
Association football midfielders
O'Higgins F.C. footballers
Deportes Copiapó footballers
Cobresal footballers
Deportes Iberia footballers
Club Deportivo Palestino footballers
First Vienna FC players
Primera B de Chile players
Chilean Primera División players
Segunda División Profesional de Chile players